Tenants of the House is a 2019 Nollywood film written by Tunde Babalola, produced by Dr. Wale Okediran and directed by Kunle Afolayan under the sponsorship of Ford Foundation, Premero Consulting Ltd, Bank of Industry, and National Livestock Transformation Plan. The movie was based on Wale Okediran fictional novel written in 2009 and it mostly focused on political conspiracies, girl child education and betrayals.

The film stars Yakubu Mohammed, Joselyn Dumas, Dele Odule, Saeed Funkymallam, Chris Iheuwa, Umar Gombe.

Plot 
The movie is about lower chamber of the national assembly following the script of the novel written by the producer. It is all about a politician (Kunle Afolayan) who stands to settle the feud between the Hausa and Fulani in the Green chamber by passing a bill.

Synopsis 

The movie revolves around a selfless congressman who wants to use his position to settle the ancient conflict between the Fulani herdsmen and Hausa farmers. He singlehandedly sponsored a bill that will eradicate the vendetta but he had to face different issues from corrupt congressmen who do not care about the conflict.

Premiere 
The movie was premiered on 25 June 2021 in Abuja at the Sheraton hotel and it was also screened nationwide.

Cast 
 Kunle Afolayan as politician
 Ahmed Abdulrasheed as Assassin
 Jadesola Abolanle as housemaid
 Idris Abubakar as young Samuel
 Adam Adeniyi as caterer
 Adeniran Adeyemi as Arese's Driver
 Sanni O. Amina as Hon. Four
 Olusesan Atolagbe as Hon. Three
 Ganiu Baba as Alhaji Megida
 Dasu Babalola as Pot belly Man
 Issa Bello as Batejo's Father
 Adeniyi Dare as Henchman
 Joselyn Dumas as Hon. Elizabeth
 Kent Edunjobi as party band leader

References 

English-language Nigerian films
2019 films
Nigerian drama films